The Oozlefinch is the unofficial historic mascot of the Air Defense Artillery – and formerly of the  U.S. Army Coast Artillery Corps. The Oozlefinch is portrayed as a flightless, featherless bird that flies backwards (at supersonic speeds) and carries weapons of the Air Defense and Coast Artillery, most often a Nike-Hercules Missile. The Oozlefinch has been portrayed in many different forms and artistic interpretations through its history.

History
There are many legends about the origins of the Oozlefinch. Most agree that the legend began in 1905 at Ft. Monroe, Virginia, then home of the Coast Artillery Corps. Captain H. M. Merriam, no doubt under the effects of alcohol, first reported seeing a large-eyed, flight-challenged bird outside the officers' club. Soon more people reported seeing this bird, and sketches were made. Eventually, the legend of the bird would become so great that a statue was erected at the club in its honor.

The Oozlefinch was used on the insignia of the Railway Artillery Reserve during World War I; In some descriptions, this bird is a pelican. The Distinctive Unit Insignia of the 42nd Field Artillery Brigade later included the oozlefinch, describing the insignia as: "On a wreath of the colors (Or and Gules) an oozlefinch (from the shoulder sleeve insignia worn by the Railway Artillery Reserve in France) Vert, armed, capped and collared on the legs."

Symbolism
The Oozlefinch's eyes are very large, allowing it to see very distant and very clearly in the sky. Its vision is unobstructed by eyelids or eyebrows, and the eyes are said to be able to turn 180 degrees so the Oozlefinch can look inward, symbolizing the need of a good leader for inward reflection.

Heraldry
The heraldic tradition of the Oozlefinch includes a coat of arms, the symbology of which is:

See also
Air Defense Artillery
Coastal Artillery
Fort Bliss, Texas
Fort Sill, Oklahoma
Oozlum bird
Ordnance Corps
Saint Barbara, patron saint of artillerymen
United States Army

References

Nike Historical Society

External links 
"Legend & Lore of the Coast Artillery Corps" at the Coast Defense Study Group website
"The Shield of the 461st AAA Battalion"
"Oozlefinch Roosts at ADA Museum"

Anti-aircraft warfare
Heraldic birds
Bird mascots
Military animals
20th-century military history of the United States
United States Army Coast Artillery Corps